Philip Gell (1775–1842) was a British Whig politician. Gell was a quiet M.P. who bought his constituency for £4,000. He was the High Sheriff of Derbyshire in 1822.

Biography
Gell was the son of Philip Eyre Gell of Hopton Hall. He was educated at Manchester Grammar School. Gell was offered a position as M.P. for Malmesbury which he bought for £4,000. In 1797 he married Georgiana Nicholos. There is no record of any speeches he made whilst serving for either Malmesbury or for Penryn.

In 1822 he was the High Sheriff of Derbyshire. Gell died in 1842 and left his estate to his only living child who was the wife of William Pole Thornhill.

References

External links 
 

1775 births
1842 deaths
High Sheriffs of Derbyshire
British Roman Catholics
Members of the Parliament of the United Kingdom for Malmesbury
UK MPs 1807–1812
UK MPs 1812–1818
Members of the Parliament of the United Kingdom for Penryn
Whig (British political party) MPs